Afraid to Talk is a 1932 American pre-Code drama film directed by Edward L. Cahn and written by Tom Reed. The film stars Eric Linden, Sidney Fox, Tully Marshall, Louis Calhern, George Meeker and Robert Warwick.

Release 
The film was released on December 1, 1932, by Universal Pictures.

Cast
Eric Linden as Eddie Martin
Sidney Fox as Peggy Martin
Tully Marshall as District Attorney. Anderson
Louis Calhern as Asst. District Attorney John Wade
George Meeker as Lenny Collins
Robert Warwick as Jake Stranskey
Berton Churchill as Mayor William 'Billy' Manning
Edward Arnold as Jig Skelli
Mayo Methot as Marge Winters
Matt McHugh as Joe Skelli
Thomas E. Jackson as Deputy Benchley
Frank Sheridan as Police Commissioner Garvey
Ian Maclaren as Chief Frank Hyers
Gustav von Seyffertitz as Attorney Harry Berger
Reginald Barlow as Judge MacMurray
Edward Martindel as Mayor Jamison
Joyce Compton as Alice
John Ince as Bill
George Chandler as Pete 
Arthur Housman as Archie

References

External links
 

1932 films
1930s English-language films
American drama films
1932 drama films
Universal Pictures films
Films directed by Edward L. Cahn
American black-and-white films
American films based on plays
1930s American films